The Order of Ľudovít Štúr is the third highest Slovak state decoration (after the Order of the White Double Cross and the Order of Andrej Hlinka) conferred by the President of the Slovak Republic upon the proposal of the government. The president, who is a recipient, 1st Class, of the order by virtue of holding office, is not obligated to respect the proposal.

The medal is awarded to Slovak citizens who have made exceptional contributions to democracy and human rights, the defence and security of the republic, or for exceptionally significant merit in the fields of politics, state management and administration, the development of the national economy, science and technology, culture, art, education, sports, and for significant spread of the good name of the Slovak Republic abroad.

The Order of Ľudovít Štúr, instituted on 2 February 1994, is bestowed annually on 1 September, on the occasion of the anniversary of the approval of the Constitution of Slovakia. It is named after the Slovak poet, philosopher, politician, and writer Ľudovít Štúr (1815–1856).

Classes
The award has two types—civil and military; each type has three classes, ranked by degree of merit.

Selected recipients
Sources:

1st Class, civil

 Ján Chryzostom Korec
 Alexander Dubček
 Július Binder
 Milan Rúfus
 Dominik Tatarka
 Dominik Hrušovský
 Ľubor Kresák
 Ľudovít Rajter
 Juraj Schenk
 Sergej Kozlík
 Peter Baco
 Ondrej Lenárd
 Ladislav Chudík
 Michal Kováč
 František Zvarík
 Miroslav Kusý
 Štefan Vrablec
 Emília Vášáryová
 Ján Popluhár
 Hana Ponická
 Mária Kráľovičová
 Milan Hamada
 Peter Šťastný
 Jaroslav Filip
 Ján Stanislav
 Juraj Králik
 Miloslav Mečíř
 Vojtech Zamarovský
 Michal Dočolomanský
 Branislav Varsik
 Eugen Suchoň
 Michal Martikán
 Anastasiya Kuzmina
 Henrieta Farkašová
 Ernest Valko
 Ján Langoš
 Ivan Kamenec
 Martin Milan Šimečka
 Ilja Zeljenka
 Zuzana Kronerová
 Peter Breiner
 Daniela Hantuchová
 Ján Kuciak
 Veronika Velez-Zuzulová
 Magdaléna Vášáryová
 Zuzana Žirková
 Pavol Demitra
 Rudolf Chmel

1st Class, military
 Ján Golian
 Rudolf Viest
 Ivan Bella

2nd Class, civil

 Vojtech Zamarovský
 Alfréd Wetzler
 Imrich Andrejčák
 Miroslav Šatan
 Bohdan Warchal
 Ľubomír Lipták
 Peter Jaroš
 Martina Moravcová
 Martin Slivka
 Martin Bútora
 Anton Srholec
 Ján Starší
 Ján Zachara
 Eugen Jurzyca
 Dominik Hrbatý
 Karol Kučera
 Soňa Valentová
 Mirosław Iringh
 Jozef Plachý
 Zdeno Chára

2nd Class, military
 Ján Nálepka

3rd Class, civil

 Michal Drobný
 Elena Lacková
 Eva Siracká
 Ján Riapoš
 Michal Mertiňák
 Peter Solan
 Vladimír Godár

References

External links
 President of the Slovak Republic official website
 State Honours, Orders & Decorations – website of the Slovak Republic (archived)

Orders, decorations, and medals of Slovakia
Awards established in 1994
1994 establishments in Slovakia